Erebia medusa, the woodland ringlet, is a member of the subfamily Satyrinae of the family Nymphalidae.

Subspecies 
Subspecies include:
 Erebia medusa brigobanna Fruhstorfer, 1917
 Erebia medusa euphrasia Fruhstorfer, 1917 (Bulgaria, Bosnia)
 Erebia medusa hippomedusa (Alps) 
 Erebia medusa medusa
 Erebia medusa psodea Hübner, 1804 (Eastern Europe, Caucasus)
 Erebia medusa schansiana Goltz, 1937
 Erebia medusa transiens Heyne, 1895
 Erebia medusa turkestana Eisner, 1946 (Turkestan)
 Erebia medusa uralensis Staudinger, 1871

Distribution and habitat
This species is present in most of Europe, from France across central and eastern Europe to western Asia.

Description
The antennae are club shaped. Wings are dark brown. Forewings have an orange-yellow postmedian band, with two adjacent pupillated ocelli near the apex and one or two smaller ones. There are at least four bright orange ringed eyespots on the hindwing. The number of eyespots is rather variable. The two sides of the wings are similar. The female is generally paler than the male. The ribbed eggs are white or light green speckled with brown. The caterpillars are about 20 millimeters long, light beige or pale green with a dark dorsal stripe. The chrysalis is light brown.

Description in Seitz
E. medusa F. (= ligea Esp., themistocles de Loche, medea Bkh.) (35 f). In the reddish yellow macular distal band there are two larger white-centred black ocelli near the apex placed close together, being sometimes united. The ocelli which are situated in the other spots — usually 3 — are smaller, being often reprented by blind black dots. The hindwing has 3—4 reddish yellow separated spots bearing white-centred black ocelli. The somewhat lighter underside has the same pattern as the upper. Modifications as regards the number of the ocelli and reddish yellow spots occur frequently. Central Europe, from Northern Germany and Belgium southward to Soutli France, Central Italy and the Balcan, eastwards to the Amur, flying also in the plains.

— In the form psodea Hbn. (= eumenis Frr) (35 f) the macularm band is somewhat lighter and broader; the ocelli, especially in the band of the hindwing, are larger and bear a more conspicuous white pupil. In South Hungary, the Balcan, Caucasus, and Western Siberia : is said to occur occasionally in Central Europe as aberration. — procopiani Hormuz., with blind ocelli, is a smaller form from the Bukowina. — hippomedusa  O. (35 g) is still smaller; occurs in the alpine regions,  the macular band being reduced and the ocelli smaller. — polaris Stgr. (35 g) is but little larger than the preceding form, the macular band being obsolescent on the hindwing beneath. Lapland, Finmark, Norway - uralensis Stgr. (= medusa Er.) (35 g), with less ocelli, otherwise but little different from polaris, forming a transition towards the latter, the underside of the hindwing being different. In the Southern Ural, the Kirghizsteppe and the adjacent districts of Siberia. — subalpina Gumpp. Beneath like medusa, but deep black above, the forewing bearing ferruginous red black-dotted spots; in the Bavarian Alps, up to 3000 ft. — transiens Ruhl-Heyne (= medusa var. Stgr) comes nearer psodea ; the ocelli are larger and more numerous than in medusa ; the hindwing beneath more or less dusted with grey in the female ; East Siberia. — Larva light green, with light-edged dark dorsal line, a light line above the stigmata, a white line above the legs, and 2 black ocelli on the head. It feeds on various grasses, as Panicum sanguinale, Millium effusum, etc., hibernates and changes the end of April into a light grey pupa, which lies on the ground in a loose web, the butterfly appearing in 4 weeks. The species is on the wing from the end of May to early July, occurring in the woods in meadows and on grassy roads, in road-ditches, etc., the flight being slow but irregular and probing. The males are very abundant, while the females remain at rest, appearing but towards
the end of the period of flight.

Biology
The females lay their eggs individually or in small groups on grasses. Caterpillars feed on Gramineae, Digitaria, Milium effusum, Panicum, Setaria, Brachypodium, Festuca and Bromus species. Adults fly from May to August. This species overwinters as a caterpillar for one or two years depending on the altitude of its habitat.

References

Bibliography
 M. Chinery et P. Leraut, Photoguide des papillons d'Europe, Delachaux et Niestlé
 Stuhldrehrer, G. & T. Fartmann (2015): Oviposition-site preferences of a declining butterfly Erebia medusa (Lepidoptera: Satyrinae) in nutrient-poor grasslands. — European Journal for Entomology 112(3): 493–499
 Tom Tolman, Richard Lewington, Guide des papillons d'Europe et d'Afrique du Nord, Delachaux et Niestlé, 1998 -

External links
 Paolo Mazzei, Daniel Morel, Raniero Panfili Moths and Butterflies of Europe and North Africa
 Schmetterling-raupe.de

Erebia
Butterflies of Europe
Butterflies of Asia
Butterflies described in 1775